Nymbai Forest Park  is a forest park in the Gambia. Established on January 1, 1954, it covers 202 hectares.

It is located at an elevation of 28 meters above sea level.

References

Protected areas established in 1954
Forest parks of the Gambia